The Monument to the Fallen for Spain (Spanish: Monumento a los Caídos por España) or the Monument to the Heroes of the Second of May (Monumento a los Héroes del Dos de Mayo), popularly known as el Obelisco ("the Obelisk"), is a war memorial in Madrid, Spain.

History and description 
It is located at the Plaza de la Lealtad, between the Madrid Stock Exchange Building and the Ritz Hotel, next to the Paseo del Prado.

Standing close to 30 metre high, the monument is built on the place where General Joachim Murat ordered the execution of numerous Spaniards after the Dos de Mayo Uprising of 1808. After various attempts to create a memorial as an homage to the participants of the uprising, the inauguration of the monument took place on May 2, 1840, the anniversary of the event. On November 22, 1985, King Juan Carlos I re-inaugurated the monument as a memorial to all those who gave their life for Spain, including those that died in conflicts other than the Peninsular War. Since then, a flame fuelled by gas has been constantly burning on the front of the monument. This parallels other war memorials around the world of national symbolic importance, frequently known as the Tomb of the Unknown Soldier.

References 

1840 establishments in Spain
Buildings and structures completed in 1840
Buildings and structures in Jerónimos neighborhood, Madrid
Monuments and memorials in Madrid
Military history of Spain
Obelisks in Spain
Peninsular War monuments and memorials
Joachim Murat